Paul Leroy (1860–1942) was a French painter.

Paul Leroy may also refer to:

 Paul Leroy (archer), French archer
 Paul Leroy (fencer), French fencer
 Paul LeRoy, the Peter Kay character